Andrew Shaw is the President and CEO of the Toronto Symphony Orchestra. In 2011 he was awarded the Strategic Perspectives in Nonprofit Management (SPNM) Scholarship in recognition for being one of Toronto's non-profit leaders.

Shaw graduated from Queen's University in 1974 with a Bachelor of Music; the University of Western Ontario in 1977 with a Master of Music; and from the University of Toronto's Rotman School of Management in 1985 with a Master of Business Administration.

References

Queen's University at Kingston alumni
University of Western Ontario alumni
University of Toronto alumni
Year of birth missing (living people)
Living people
Canadian chief executives